The molecular formula C20H34O5 (molar mass: 354.48 g/mol, exact mass: 354.2406 u) may refer to:

 Prostaglandin F2alpha
 Prostaglandin E1 (PGE1), or alprostadil

Molecular formulas